NHL Outdoors at Lake Tahoe was a series of two outdoor regular season National Hockey League (NHL) games, held on the weekend of February 20–21, 2021. Both games were played without fans at a rink on the 18th fairway of the Edgewood Tahoe Resort in Stateline, Nevada, on the south shore of Lake Tahoe.

The first game scheduled for February 20, titled Bridgestone NHL Outdoors Saturday, featured the Vegas Golden Knights and Colorado Avalanche, and the second game on the following day, titled Honda NHL Outdoors Sunday, pitted the  Philadelphia Flyers against the Boston Bruins. The series was scheduled as a replacement for both the 2021 Winter Classic and Stadium Series games, which were canceled due to the COVID-19 pandemic.

Background
The NHL originally scheduled the outdoor games for the 2020–21 season prior to the COVID-19 pandemic. The Winter Classic, planned for January 1, 2021, was to feature the Minnesota Wild hosting the St. Louis Blues at Target Field, and the Stadium Series game was to be hosted by the Carolina Hurricanes at Carter–Finley Stadium on February 20, against an unannounced opponent. The league announced on October 22, 2020, that the Winter Classic was being postponed to the next season due to "ongoing uncertainty" of the pandemic since fan participation is considered "integral to [its] success. The decision to further postpone the Stadium Series game was made on December 23, also because fans would likely not be able to attend.

In seeking an alternative outdoor stadium with fans not likely to be in attendance, the league focused on natural landscapes capable of mimicking pond hockey and not an in-person fan experience. The Edgewood Tahoe Resort in Stateline, Nevada, in the Lake Tahoe region, was chosen over Lake Louise, Alberta, and Park City, Utah. This is the same golf course that has hosted the American Century Championship annually since 1990. The golf course was selected because the actual Lake Tahoe does not freeze over and therefore is not suitable for ice hockey play.

With no fans allowed at the event, the geographic location of the teams became less important, as the games became made-for-television showcases. The nearest teams to Lake Tahoe are the Vegas Golden Knights and San Jose Sharks, but the Sharks were not scheduled for the event due to scheduling uncertainties related to Santa Clara County's local COVID-19 health restrictions on contact sports, as well the expectation that the team would finish with a losing record as in the prior season. The Philadelphia Flyers and the Boston Bruins were offered the opportunity to play in both games, but decided to take part in only one contest.

With the NHL's condensed 56-game regular season schedule and limited geographical travel due to the pandemic, few off-days were scheduled between games. However, allocations were made in the schedule to make travel more manageable.

On February 10, Greg Wyshynski of ESPN reported a message from NHL chief creative officer Steve Mayer, informing them that the league had backup teams in place should any of the teams scheduled for the Lake Tahoe games become unavailable due to COVID protocols.

Unlike previous NHL outdoor games in which speciality jerseys were created, all four teams participating in the games wore their “Reverse Retro” jerseys from that season’s league-wide promotion.

Game one

The Vegas Golden Knights (VGK) and the Colorado Avalanche (COL) began play on February 20 at 12:12 p.m. PT (3:12 p.m. ET). Play was suspended after the first period due to ice conditions caused by its exposure to heat and sunlight; the game was resumed at 9:02 p.m. PT (12:02 a.m. ET). The game ended at approximately 10:50 p.m. PT (1:50 a.m. ET) with Colorado winning, 3–2.

Game summary

Number in parenthesis represents the player's total in goals or assists to that point of the season

Team rosters

 Oscar Dansk and Adam Werner dressed as the back-up goaltenders. Neither entered the game.

 Starting lineup.

Scratches
Vegas Golden Knights: Robin Lehner, Tomas Nosek
Colorado Avalanche: Dennis Gilbert

Game two

The game between the Philadelphia Flyers (PHI) and Boston Bruins (BOS) was scheduled for February 21, originally at noon PT (3:00 p.m. ET); in the week before the game, the start time was adjusted to 11:00 a.m. local time. Due to the delay on Saturday of game one, the league announced that game two would be moved later in the day on Sunday, to start at 4:30 p.m. local time. The actual start time of the game was 4:59 p.m. local time, and it ended at 7:25 p.m. PT (10:25 p.m. ET) as a 7–3 win for Boston.

Game summary

Number in parenthesis represents the player's total in goals or assists to that point of the season

Team rosters

 Brian Elliott and Jaroslav Halak dressed as the back-up goaltenders. Elliott played the third period for Philadelphia.

 Starting lineup.

Scratches
Philadelphia Flyers: Claude Giroux, Justin Braun, David Kase
Boston Bruins: Steven Kampfer, David Krejci, Kevan Miller

Officials
The same officials worked both games:
 Referees: Wes McCauley, Kelly Sutherland
 Linesmen: Matt MacPherson, Jonny Murray

Media

Both games were originally planned to be televised in the United States on NBC. Coverage of the Saturday game began as scheduled on NBC, but was then moved to NBCSN due to the delay. As a result of the Sunday game being moved to a 7:30 p.m. ET start time, it too was moved from NBC to NBCSN (with an evening game between the New Jersey Devils and Washington Capitals swapped into NBC's afternoon window as a replacement). Mike Tirico provided the play-by-play commentary with United States Hockey Hall of Fame member and analyst Eddie Olczyk and "Inside-the-Glass" reporter Brian Boucher. Rutledge Wood meanwhile, served as an on-site reporter in Lake Tahoe.

Both games were originally scheduled to be simulcast on Sportsnet in Canada. Due to the conflict with the Calgary Flames–Edmonton Oilers Hockey Night in Canada broadcast, coverage of the delayed second and third periods of Saturday's game began on Sportsnet One before Sportsnet joined it in progress. The second game was also moved to Sportsnet One.

References

NHL Outdoor Games
NHL Outdoor Games
NHL Outdoor Games
Ice hockey in Nevada
NHL outdoor games
Colorado Avalanche games
Vegas Golden Knights games
Philadelphia Flyers games
Boston Bruins games